Ravenous Records, a division of Ravenous Entertainment, was formed in 1998 by Jim Steinman and Steven Rinkoff. Rinkoff best explained the purpose of the label (and how it went wrong) in a May 2005 interview with BroadwayWorld.com, "Jim and I have a label called Ravenous Records where initially the idea was just to find great singers for Jim's songs, and as hard as that could be, we somehow got skewed into finding people that were writing their own songs, and then we became a label where we were putting out artists that had nothing to do with Jim's music."

Nicki French was signed to the label in 2000 during which time she recorded two tracks 'Lovers Again' (Bonnie Tyler cover) and 'Two Out Of Three Ain't Bad' (Meat Loaf cover),  both of which never got released commercially.

Currently, the label is pretty much inactive, but it is very active in the production of live events, such as the soon-to-be-released debut album by The Dream Engine, containing songs mostly written by Steinman.  It is now owned by Sony Music Entertainment.

Roster
 Hewitt Huntwork
 Boyzone
 Nicki French
 The Dream Engine

Discography

Singles
 Boyzone, "No Matter What" (Steinman/Lloyd Webber) - August 1998; also featured "Where Have You Been," Phil da Costa's Oxygen Edit of "All That I Need," "She's The One" and a live interview #1 in 18 countries, over 5 million singles sold
 Boyzone, "All The Time In The World" - 5 October 1998

Albums
 Boyzone, Where We Belong - 17 November 1998
 Wuthering Heights (original soundtrack) -- co-released by the MTV Original Movies label in November 2003; track list: "Prelude: The Future Ain't What It Used To Be" (Steinman), "More" (Eldritch/Steinman), "I Will Crumble" (Huntwork), "If It Ain't Broke (Break It)" (Steinman), "Shine" (Huntwork), "The Future Ain't What It Used To Be" (Steinman)

Unreleased
Nicki French "Two Out Of Three Ain't Bad," "Lovers Again"

See also
 List of record labels

British record labels
Record labels established in 1998
Sony Music
Pop record labels